The 1949 USC Trojans baseball team represented the University of Southern California in the 1949 NCAA baseball season. The Trojans played their home games at Bovard Field. The team was coached by Sam Barry serving his 17th year and Rod Dedeaux in his 8th year at USC.

The Trojans won the California Intercollegiate Baseball Association championship, the Pacific Coast Conference Tournament and advanced to the College World Series, where they were defeated by the Wake Forest Demon Deacons.

Roster

Schedule

Awards and honors 
Jim Brideweser
 First Team All-American American Baseball Coaches Association
 First Team All-CIBA

Hank Cedillos
 Second Team All-CIBA

Art Mazmanian
 Second Team All-American American Baseball Coaches Association
 First Team All-CIBA

Bruce McKelvey
 First Team All-CIBA

Don Pender
 First Team All-CIBA

Rudy Regalado
 Second Team All-CIBA

Bill Sharman
 Second Team All-CIBA

Jack Schlarb
 Second Team All-CIBA

Bob Zube
 First Team All-CIBA

References 

USC Trojans baseball seasons
USC Trojans baseball
College World Series seasons
USC
Pac-12 Conference baseball champion seasons